Five Stories is an album by singer/songwriter Kris Delmhorst. Delmhorst is a multi-instrumentalist who adds a full acoustic band to this release.

Reception

Allmusic stated that "Five Stories is a very satisfying album, sure to please fans and anyone who appreciates intelligent songwriters."

Track listing 

All songs by Kris Delmhorst unless noted.

 "Cluck Old Hen" (Delmhorst, Traditional) – 3:17
 "Damn Love Song" – 4:54
 "Broken White Line" – 3:24
 "Little Wings" – 3:03
 "Words Fail You" - 5:52
 "Just What I Meant" – 3:23
 "Yellow Brick Road" – 3:43
 "Garden Rose" – 4:43
 "Mean Old Wind" – 2:29
 "Honeyed Out" – 3:31
 "Gave It Away" – 4:41
 "Lullaby 101" – 3:00

Personnel
Kris Delmhorst - vocals, guitar, organ, cello
Billy Conway - percussion, drums, vibraphone
Sean Staples - banjo, guitar, mandolin, drums, percussion
David Champagne - guitar
Dana Colley - sax, Jew's-harp
Cate Curtis - background vocals
Tom Halter - flugelhorn
Evan Harriman - organ
Tim Kelly - dobro
Eric Roper - banjo
Jennifer Kimball - background vocals, drums, percussion
Andrew Mazzone - bass, drums, guitar
Nolan McKelvey - bass, background vocals
Lori McKenna - background vocals
Dave Rizzuti - pedal steel guitar

Production
 Produced by Kris Delmhorst and Billy Conway
 Engineered by Billy Conway
 Mastered by Jeff Lipton
 Design and photography by Kris Delmhorst and Megan Summers

References

External links
 Official Kris Delmhorst website
Signature Sounds Recordings

2001 albums
Kris Delmhorst albums